Yichang Metro is a rapid transit system planned in Yichang, in Central China's Hubei province. It will include three lines.

Lines

Line 1

Line 1 is a line from Yiling Bus Terminal in Yiling District via Xiling District to Gongsheng in Wujiagang District.

Line 2

Line 2 is a line from Gongtong Road(E) in Wujiagang District via Yichang East Railway Station, Yichang Sanxia Airport, Xiaoting District to Baiyang and it is planned to extend to Zhijiang in the future.

Line 3

Line 3 is a line from Yiling Bus Terminal in Yiling District and transfer Line 1 at Yiling Square in Xiling District to Yichang South Railway Station in Dianjun District.

Planning Map

References

External links

Yichang
Rapid transit in China
Rail transport in Hubei
Proposed rapid transit